is a Japanese former racing driver and businessman.

Motorsport career
He won the Japanese motocross national championships in the 90cc and 125cc classes for Kawasaki in 1968 before switching to cars as a Nissan factory driver in 1969.

Hoshino participated in two Formula One Grands Prix, debuting on 24 October 1976 at the Japanese Grand Prix, making him - along with compatriots Noritake Takahara and Masahiro Hasemi - the first Japanese driver to start a Formula One Grand Prix. Driving a Tyrrell-Ford for Heros Racing, he ran as high as fourth, but retired having used up his tyre supply. He returned in 1977 and once again entered the Japanese Grand Prix driving for Heros Racing. He finished in eleventh place driving a year-old Kojima-Ford. He scored no championship points in his Formula 1 career.

His only major world championship win was in the 1985 World Sportscar Championship round at the Fuji 1000 race, which was boycotted by many competing teams due to torrential rain.

Hoshino won the Japanese Formula 2000 championship in 1975 and 1977, before winning the Japanese Formula Two championship in 1978.  He then competed in the Japanese Formula 3000 championship, winning that title in 1987, 1990 and 1993. His 6 championships and 39 race wins still stand as series records.

Hoshino also dominated the Fuji Grand Champion Series in the 1970s and 1980s. He won five titles in 1978, 1982, 1984, 1985 and 1987, collecting 28 wins and 42 podiums.

Like his compatriot, Masahiro Hasemi, he continued his career racing for Nissan, driving a Skyline GT-R to win the Japanese Touring Car Championship in 1990. Hoshino drove a Nissan R90C with Toshio Suzuki to win the 1990 Suzuka 1000 race. Hoshino and Suzuki also won the All Japan Sports Prototype Championship in 1991 and 1992. Along with Nissan Motorsports teammates Aguri Suzuki and Masahiko Kageyama, Hoshino drove a Nissan R390 GT1 to a third-place finish at the 1998 24 Hours of Le Mans.

Hoshino retired from racing in 2002 and now continues to run his own Super GT team and his own Nissan specialised aftermarket parts company, Impul. Since 2003, his racing team has won the Formula Nippon championship seven times in eight years. His son, Kazuki Hoshino, currently competes in Super GT driving for GAINER in the GT300 class.

Racing record

All Japan FJ1300 Championship results
(key) (Races in bold indicate pole position)

Complete All Japan F2000/All Japan F2/All Japan F3000/Formula Nippon results
(key) (Races in bold indicate pole position) (Races in italics indicate fastest lap)

Complete Fuji Grand Championship results

Complete Formula One results
(key)

Complete European Formula Two Championship results
(key) (Races in bold indicate pole position; races in italics indicate fastest lap)

Complete JTC/JTCC results
(key) (Races in bold indicate pole position) (Races in italics indicate fastest lap)

Complete JGTC results
(key)

Complete 24 Hours of Le Mans results

Complete Bathurst 1000 results

References

External links
 Kazuyoshi Hoshino profile at the Japan Automobile Federation
 Calsonic Sponsor's site 
 Impul Own aftermarket company and team site 
 Calsonic racing team 
 Nismo.com: Hoshino History 1969-2002   - charting the motorsport career of Hoshino
 

1947 births
Living people
People from Shizuoka (city)
Japanese racing drivers
Japanese Formula One drivers
Japanese Formula Two Championship drivers
European Formula Two Championship drivers
Japanese Formula 3000 Championship drivers
Formula Nippon drivers
24 Hours of Le Mans drivers
24 Hours of Daytona drivers
Japanese Touring Car Championship drivers
Japanese motocross riders
World Sportscar Championship drivers
Sports car racing team owners
Carlin racing drivers
Grand Champion Series drivers
Long Distance Series drivers
Japanese Sportscar Championship drivers
Australian Endurance Championship drivers
Nismo drivers